3, 2, 1... Frankie Go Boom is a 2012 comedy film directed by Jordan Roberts and starring Charlie Hunnam, Chris O'Dowd, Lizzy Caplan, and Ron Perlman.

Plot
Two brothers (Charlie Hunnam and Chris O'Dowd) seek the help of a transgender hacker (Ron Perlman) in erasing all evidence of a sex tape from the internet before the unhinged movie star father (Chris Noth) of the girl involved (Lizzy Caplan) seeks violent revenge.  Cast member Lizzy Caplan described the plot: "It's about a guy whose life has been ruined by a YouTube video that has gone viral and so he's been hiding out and he gets brought back into civilization (because he's been living in the middle of nowhere) by his really manipulative, horrible brother. And everybody in his life is sort of terrible [and it's about] how he deals with that."

Cast
Charlie Hunnam as Frankie
Chris O'Dowd as Bruce
Lizzy Caplan as Lassie
Nora Dunn as Karen
Whitney Cummings as Claudia
Ron Perlman as Phyllis
Chris Noth as Jack
Sam Anderson as Chris

Development
Filming began on the week of November 10, 2010.

Ron Perlman was offered two different roles in the film, but accepted the role of a transsexual character. He is quoted as saying "They offered me two different roles and I went for the transsexual because I felt like when the door opens and you see that it's me, it should get a 'Yuck!'"

Reception
, the film holds a 45% approval rating on Rotten Tomatoes, based on 22 reviews with an average rating of 5.26/10.

References

External links
 

2012 films
American comedy films
2012 comedy films
Variance Films films
Films about trans women
2012 LGBT-related films
LGBT-related comedy films
2010s English-language films
Films directed by Jordan Roberts
2010s American films